This is a list of bridges documented by the Historic American Engineering Record in the U.S. state of Connecticut.

Bridges

See also
List of bridges of the Merritt Parkway
List of bridges on the National Register of Historic Places in Connecticut
List of movable bridges in Connecticut

References

List
Connecticut
Bridges
Bridges
List